Joy of a Toy is the debut solo album of Kevin Ayers, a founding member of Soft Machine. He is accompanied on the LP by pianist and arranger David Bedford as well as his erstwhile Soft Machine colleagues Robert Wyatt and Mike Ratledge, and his eventual replacement Hugh Hopper, who had previously worked with him in the semi-pro band Wilde Flowers. Among the session musicians are cellist and arranger Paul Buckmaster, jazz bassist Jeff Clyne, oboist Paul Minns (of Third Ear Band) and drummer Rob Tait (formerly of Pete Brown and His Battered Ornaments before going on to join Vinegar Joe).

Background
After a Soft Machine tour of the US with the Jimi Hendrix Experience, Ayers had decided to retire from the music business. Hendrix, however, presented Ayers with an acoustic Gibson J-200 guitar on the condition that he continue his songwriting. Ayers repaired to a small London flat where he composed and arranged a whole LP which was then presented to Malcolm Jones' fledgling Harvest label, where it was produced by Peter Jenner for the then exorbitant sum of £4000.

Joy of a Toy featured many of Ayers' most enduring songs from "The Lady Rachel" to "Girl on a Swing", the latter still regularly covered by artists to this day such as Candie Payne and The Ladybug Transistor. It was on Joy that Ayers developed his sonorous vocal delivery, an avant-garde song construction and an affection for unusual instrumentation, that would have a deep influence far into the 1970s and up to the end of his career. He was assisted in this latter undertaking by David Bedford, who provided the musical arrangements for the album as well as playing piano and other keyboards.

For the recording of Syd Barrett's first solo album The Madcap Laughs, Soft Machine were brought in to do overdubs for a few of Barrett's tracks. It was during this time that Barrett recorded a guitar part for the track "Religious Experience", (later titled "Singing a Song in the Morning"); this version was not released until the 2003 reissue of Joy.

Track listing

Personnel

Musicians
 Kevin Ayers – guitars, bass, melodica, harmonica, vocals
 Robert Wyatt – drums
 David Bedford – piano, mellotron, arranger
 Mike Ratledge – organ
 Hugh Hopper – bass (1 and 5)
 Paul Buckmaster – cello
 Jeff Clyne - double bass (2 and 7)
 Rob Tait – drums (tracks 6 and 9)
 Paul Minns – oboe

Additional musicians on tracks 11, 14 & 16
 Syd Barrett – guitar (track 11 only)
 Richard Sinclair – bass
 Richard Coughlan – drums
 David Sinclair – organ
 The Ladybirds – backing vocals

Shortly after Barrett's death, Ayers told Mojo magazine that when Barrett arrived at the studio: "....he was out-of-it....wasn't able to tune his guitar or find the chords". A third guitar is present on track 14 [take 103], most noticeably at 0:54-1:03, 1:37-1:42 and 2:34-2:51.

Technical
 Kevin Ayers – producer
 Peter Jenner – producer
 Peter Mew – engineer
 Laurie Asprey – photography

References

Kevin Ayers by Richard Williams (Melody Maker 25 Apr 1970)
Joy of a Toy liner notes by Mark Powell (EMI 2003)
Joy of a Toy liner notes by Martin Wakeling (Harvest Sept 2006)

External links
Joy of a Toy - Best Albums of All Time by Peter Paphides

1969 debut albums
Kevin Ayers albums
Harvest Records albums
Albums produced by Kevin Ayers
Albums produced by Peter Jenner